This is a list of team records for the New York Mets baseball team.

Career records

Batting

Pitching

Single season records

Batting

Pitching

Single game records

Batting

Pitching

See also
Baseball statistics
List of Major League Baseball franchise postseason streaks
New York Mets award winners and league leaders

Records
New York Mets